Code of the Krillitanes is a BBC Books original novella written by Justin Richards and based on the long-running British science fiction television series Doctor Who. It features the Tenth Doctor as played by David Tennant. This paperback is part of the Quick Reads Initiative sponsored by the UK government, to encourage literacy.

References

External links 

2010 British novels
2010 science fiction novels
Doctor Who novellas
Tenth Doctor novels
Novels by Justin Richards
British science fiction novels